USS Turkey may refer to:

 , laid down on 19 August 1917 at Chester, Pennsylvania
 , laid down as YMS-444 on 16 November 1943 at Kingston, New York

References 

United States Navy ship names